College Corner may refer to:

 College Corner, Ohio, a town located partially in Butler and Preble Counties, Ohio
 West College Corner, Indiana (also known as simply "College Corner"), a town in Union County, Indiana, adjacent to College Corner, Ohio
 College Corner, Jay County, Indiana
 College Corner, Wabash County, Indiana
 College Corner, Wayne County, Indiana

See also 
 Coolidge Corner, an intersection of Beacon St. and Harvard Avenue in Brookline, Massachusetts
 Coolidge Corner (MBTA station), a streetcar station located in Brookline, Massachusetts.